Nelson Hollow is a Canadian community in the rural community of Upper Miramichi in Northumberland County, New Brunswick.

History

Notable people

See also
List of communities in New Brunswick

References

Communities in Northumberland County, New Brunswick